The Professional Building is a historic office building located at Raleigh, North Carolina. It was designed by the architectural firm Milburn, Heister & Company and built in 1925. It is an eight-story, steel frame and yellow brick veneer Classical Revival style skyscraper with Beaux Arts style terra cotta ornamental elements.  It consists of a two-story "base", five-story "shaft" and one-story "capital" in the Chicago style.

It was listed on the National Register of Historic Places in 1983.

References 

Office buildings on the National Register of Historic Places in North Carolina
Neoclassical architecture in North Carolina
Office buildings completed in 1925
Buildings and structures in Raleigh, North Carolina
National Register of Historic Places in Raleigh, North Carolina
Chicago school architecture in the United States